A referendum on holding early elections was held in the Republic of Serbia on 11 October 1992. The proposal was approved by 95.6% of voters, and early general elections were subsequently held on 20 December.

Results

References

1992 in Serbia
1992 in Yugoslavia
1992 referendums
Referendums in Serbia
Referendums in Yugoslavia
October 1992 events in Europe